Christopher Daw (born February 1, 1970, in North York, Ontario) is a paralympian and pioneer of wheelchair sports. During his athletic career he has attended over 125 National Championships, 64 World Championships, 4 Paralympics, and 1 Olympics for an estimated medal count of over 1000+ for Canada including a dozen World Championships, 19 World records, and Paralympic medal performances. His sports include track, basketball, rugby, volleyball, and curling. Internationally he competed in adaptive track, marathons, wheelchair basketball, volleyball, wheelchair rugby, and curling for Canada. He is the only Canadian athlete to represent Canada at multiple Paralympic Games for multiple sports. Also one of the few athletes to represent Canada at both Summer & Winter Paralympic Games. In 1986, he won 6 Gold medals and set 6 world records at the first World Games for disabled youth in Nottingham, England. He was a member of the 1984 & 1988 Canadian Paralympic adaptive track teams; a member of the Canadian Wheelchair Basketball team, and member of the Canadian Wheelchair Rugby Team at the 2000 Summer Paralympics before taking up wheelchair curling in 2000.

Curling

He entered curling in 2000, help develop and adapt the sport the Paralympics. He was the skip of the Canadian team at the 2002 World Wheelchair Curling Championship in Sursee, Switzerland, where after six (6) months of training the team won silver.The following year he would win Gold at the World Wheelchair cup of curing in Sctoland defeating vival Frank Duffy. The next year, he would again be the skip of the Canadian team and the Wheelchair Curling championship, again in Sursee, where the team won bronze. He would finish his curling career as the skip of the Canadian team, which won the first ever Gold in Wheelchair curling at the 2006 Winter Paralympics. In 2007 he withdrew his name from the Team Canada selection process that could have led to a spot on the 2010 Winter Paralympics. He resurfaced as part of the Wheelchair Curling Team for Newfoundland as Skip in 2008, only to relocate to British Columbia in 2009. He was the General manager of the Vancouver Curling Club when it took over the Olympic Curling center (now Hillcrest Center) in 2011.

In 2010, it was announced that Daw was returning to competitive curling by joining Jim Armstrong (curler). As Jim's second on a local BC team in provincial play-downs; with hopes of representing Team BC. Team Armstrong was unsuccessful in capturing the 2011 BC Championship title. Armstrong would later move to Ontario. Daw would announce his retirement in December 2010.

Sports Retirement
In 2010, Daw formally announced his retirement from competitive sports to focus on his family and career. In January 2012 after Eric Eales of wheelchaircurling.com stopped publishing his blog posting on wheelchair curling; it was announced Daw was taking over with a new blog spot called Wheelchair Curling Blog 2. Daw received over 5000 readers in the first month on the new blog which changed formats allowing for publishing of stories on wheelchair curling from around the world through direct input by the players, coaches or interested parties. The blog after 2015 National championships in Quebec experienced over 5.5 million+ viewers.

Post-retirement Daw has also been very active as a motivational speaker; and a member of the Department of National Defence (Canada)

Professional Career
After leaving Vancouver in 2011, in 2012, Daw signed on with Ken Strong to support a sports venue, Ice Twice Rinks Inc. in Oakville, Ontario. He became the executive director of the business. In eight months, Daw was able to fully recover the facility from financial hardship. Programs at the rink were run by experienced coaches such as Al Iafrate, Eddi Choi, Christina Kessler, and Ryan Munce.  Daw left Ice Twice Rinks in 2015, which was sold for-profit to Jamie Allison; a former NHL player with the Chicago Blackhawks.

Since 2000 Daw has been a leading reporter on the sport of wheelchair curling including the creation of the Wcblog2.com. In 2018 Daw decided to close down the Wcblog2.com due to a lack of information sharing and time commitment restrictions. Daw has also done extensive work with CBC television during the Paralympic games as a commentator in 2010, 2014 and 2018. Along with his Paralympic work, Daw began working with CBC on other ventures, including the 2018 Canadian Wheelchair Curling Championships.

Daw would continue to work with various organization such as the province of British Columbia, Island Health and now work with the department of National Defense in BC.

Disability

Daw's official disability has never been known. He has compounded his disability through numerous injuries over his athletic career, additional medical conditions and professional endeavours. With this, he is the only known person to be classifiable at the Paralympics as both a paraplegic and quadriplegic competitor.

Personal life
In 2006 it was reported that Daw had one child a son; Kyle, with his first wife Mari Brown. In March 2009 Daw married Morgan Perry, a former member of Canada's junior women's softball team. On February 23, 2010, Daw and Perry gave birth to a daughter Arowyn Emma Ellie. Daw and Perry separated in 2015.

In April 2010, Daw lost his mother Eleanor Daw at 63 years from a heart attack. According to Daw, her loss has had a profound change in him which he often referred to the reason behind his retirement from international sport.

In October 2014 after going to the doctor for what Daw thought was Kidney stones it was discovered he had renal cell carcinoma. Aggressive cancer caused Daw to undergo surgery on December 29, 2014, having a partial nephrectomy. Daw since has had two more bouts of cancer. In December 2019, Daw was clinically dead for 5 minutes after a bad drug reaction during gallbladder surgery.

On September 15, 2021, Chris's daughter (from first marriage) Chantelle Daw died at the age of 27. The case of her death still was under investigation by the London, Ontario Major Crimes (Homicide) unit. She was discovered on a bathroom floor after a fight with a male. It was planned for her to join Daw in British Columbia in just two weeks after the date of her death.

On November 27, 2022, Chris's father - Ivan Daw passed away suddenly. He was 84 years old and former coach of Chris during his time as a track and road racing athlete. He had been admitted for an intertrochanteric fracture which had occurred just 4 days prior. Although he appeared to be on a road to recovery; on the morning of November 27, 2022, he took a turn for the worse suddenly and passed away late that day. When asked by Daw what this means he was quoted: "...he was a profound influence on me in my life and Paralympic career. I miss him every moment.."

Awards
In 2010, Daw was inducted into the London Sports Hall of Fame on September 23, 2010, at a ceremony including Christine Nesbitt and Tessa Virtue & Scott Moir.

Daw's accomplishments included the following; one of the longest active Paralympic careers in history. During his athletic career, he has attended over 125 National Championships, 64 World Championships, 4 Paralympics, and 1 Olympics. For an estimated medal total of over 1000+ for Canada including a dozen World Championships, 19 World records, and Paralympic Gold medal performances. His sports include Canadian representation for Track, Basketball, Rugby, Volleyball, and Curling. He has also participated as an athlete in hockey, field, parachuting; rock climbing, badminton and holds high-level black belts in Daitō-ryū Aiki-jūjutsu.

Selected results

Filmography

Live streaming

Film

Television

References

External links
 Personal Website
 London Sports Hall of Fame Tribute Video

Medalists at the 2006 Winter Paralympics
Wheelchair rugby players at the 2000 Summer Paralympics
Wheelchair curlers at the 2006 Winter Paralympics
Paralympic gold medalists for Canada
Paralympic wheelchair curlers of Canada
1970 births
Living people
Curlers from Toronto
Sportspeople from London, Ontario
Sportspeople from North York
People from Strathroy-Caradoc
Paralympic medalists in wheelchair curling
Canadian wheelchair curling champions
Canadian wheelchair curlers